Facundo Argüello was the defending champion, but lost in the quarterfinals to Guido Andreozzi.

Carlos Berlocq won the title by defeating Diego Schwartzman 6–4, 4–6, 6–0 in the final.

Seeds

Draw

Finals

Top half

Bottom half

References
 Main Draw
 Qualifying Draw

Aberto de Tenis do Rio Grande do Sul - Singles
2014 Singles